Habib Mohamed (born August 2, 1995), better known by his stage name Puffy L'z, is a rapper and singer from Toronto, Ontario. He is of Somali descent. Puffy L'z released his debut studio album Take No L'z on July 19, 2019, and it received a 6/10 rating from Exclaim!.

Biography

2014–2018: Beginnings and Halal Gang
Puffy L’z was born and raised in Regent Park, Toronto, the biggest social housing neighborhood based in Canada. He began rapping in 2015 and released numerous freestyles during this time. His debut single Been Flexing was released on February 10, 2016, and amassed over 1 million views in the first year of release. He was featured on the track SuperStar by Nafe Smallz released on January 25, 2017. In early 2017, he performed 15 dates on Drake's Boy Meets World European Tour. He rose to fame as part of Halal Gang alongside Mustafa the Poet, Mo-G, Safe, and late rapper and long-time friend, Smoke Dawg, who was shot on Queen Street on Canada Day in 2018. As a result, Puffy L'z stopped making music for a while to mourn the death of his friend. Puffy alongside Halal Gang members Smoke Dawg and Prime Boys members Jay Whiss Donnie and Jimmy Prime come together to form the supergroup "Full Circle".

2019–present: Take No L'z

After his hiatus, Puffy L'z returned to music in early 2019. On his return he has released the single Front Gate featuring British rapper Giggs. He released his debut studio album Take No L'z on July 19, 2019, featured guest appearances from Safe, Jay Whiss, Giggs, Jay Z and Smoke Dawg. He also went on to feature on Jay Whiss's debut album Peace of Mind with the single "Valet" produced by Murda Beatz released on December 4, 2019.

Discography

Studio albums
 Take No L'z

Compilation album
 NorthernSound (by 6ixBuzz)

Filmography

References

Living people
21st-century Canadian rappers
Black Canadian musicians
Canadian hip hop singers
Canadian male rappers
Rappers from Toronto
Canadian people of Somali descent
1995 births
21st-century Canadian male musicians